Various individuals, courts and the media around the world have raised concerns about the manner in which cases of child sexual abuse are handled when they occur in congregations of Jehovah's Witnesses. An independent 2009 study in Norway was critical of how Jehovah's Witnesses dealt with cases of child sexual abuse but stated there is no indication that the rate of sexual abuse among Jehovah's Witnesses is higher than found in general society. The organization officially "abhors" child sexual abuse, and states "the incidence of this crime among Jehovah's Witnesses is rare."

The Society's child abuse policies have been published in Jehovah's Witnesses' publications, although more specific guidelines are only made available to elders, or on request. Press releases issued by the Watch Tower Society's Office of Public Information state that if a person accused of molestation repeatedly denies the charges of his victim, and there is no other witness to the incident, "the elders cannot take action within the congregation at that time", but would report to authorities if required by local laws. In 2015, it was disclosed that the Australia Branch of Jehovah's Witnesses had records of 1,006 alleged perpetrators of child sexual abuse, relating to more than 1,800 victims since 1950, none of which were reported to police by the group.

Some media and courts have reported that Jehovah's Witnesses employ organizational policies, which the group says are "Bible-based", that make the reporting of sexual abuse difficult for members. Some victims of sexual abuse have said they were ordered by local elders to maintain silence to avoid embarrassment to both the accused and the organization. Members are told they have every right to report crimes to secular authorities separately to reporting the "sin" to congregation elders.

In 2002, Jehovah's Witnesses' Office of Public Information published its policy for elders to report allegations of child abuse to the authorities only where required by law to do so, even if there was only one witness. The organization says individuals known to have sexually abused a child are generally prohibited from holding any position of responsibility, and that, unless considered by the congregation elders to demonstrate repentance, such a person is typically disfellowshipped.

In 2016 a UK judge upheld a ruling against the Jehovah's Witnesses for failing to protect a victim of child sexual abuse, and the supreme court rejected an attempt by the Watch Tower Society to block a Charity Commission inquiry into how the organisation's charity handles allegations of abuse. This was the culmination of two years of legal proceedings in five different courts and tribunals. The commission's attorney said "WTBTS has at every stage relentlessly challenged the legal basis and scope of the Charity Commission's inquiry".

In 2019, elders in New Zealand were told to destroy documents, causing survivors of child sex abuse to fear that cases will be covered up. The organization maintained that documents relevant to cases of abuse would not be destroyed.

The UK Independent Inquiry into Child Sexual Abuse was particularly critical of Jehovah's Witnesses' policy that there must be two witnesses to cases of abuse before elders would consider the allegation. IICSA maintained the policy overlooks the fact that "child sexual abuse is most often perpetrated in the absence of witnesses".

Policies

Advice to members
The Watch Tower Society has published information on how to protect children from sexual molestation, such as the articles, Protect Your Children in the October 8, 1993, edition of Awake!, Help Your Children to Thrive in Awake! of August 8, 1997, the series, Keep Your Children Safe, in the October 2007 edition of Awake!, and in the book, Learn from the Great Teacher. These articles focus on prevention, and do not specifically state that a child or its parents should contact the police in the event of molestation. They also suggest that, in some countries, "the legal system may offer little hope of successful prosecution." Whether or not a victim seeks professional treatment from psychiatrists, psychologists or therapists is suggested as being the personal decision of the victim (or the parents), but such ones are warned to "make sure that any such professional will respect your religious views."

'Two witness rule'
Jehovah's Witnesses' congregational judicial policies require the testimony of two material witnesses to establish a perpetrator's serious sin in the absence of confession. The organization considers this policy to be a protection against malicious accusations of sexual assault. The Society maintains that this two-witness policy is applied solely to congregational discipline and has no bearing on whether a crime is reported to the authorities in countries where this is mandatory.

The Society states that it is not necessary for both witnesses to have observed the same instance of child molestation to establish guilt. Since 1991, statements by two victims of separate incidents by the same perpetrator may be deemed sufficient to take action and impose internal sanctions. However, critics argue that such an approach to determining guilt overlooks the seriousness of the initial abuse, and effectively allows a pedophile to go unpunished until he or she has been caught abusing two or more different victims. DNA evidence, medical reports, or information from forensic experts or police that proves sexual abuse may possibly be accepted as a valid "second witness", however critics argue that, without mandatory reporting for all accusations of abuse regardless of the local laws, such evidence could remain undetected.

In cases where there is only one eye-witness—the victim—to an allegation of child abuse, elders may monitor the accused individual closely, or even suspend any conspicuous congregation duties—but only if there is evidence based on the testimony of more than one witness to suggest that the alleged perpetrator has abused children. In some instances where there is only one witness to molestation, elders may discreetly inform parents in a congregation not to allow their children to spend time with someone accused of child abuse provided such a person has been deemed a "predator" by the local branch office based on the elders' observations.

Questioning the victim

Elders are instructed to investigate every allegation of child sexual abuse, questioning the victim if necessary, and to do what they reasonably can to help parents to protect their children from further abuse. Elders are also instructed that they are only "spiritual shepherds" whose aim should be to provide spiritual assistance and encouragement to victims of child sexual abuse and their families, without taking on a role similar to that of a mental health professional or therapist. A Watch Tower Society representative testified that the organization does not consider itself responsible for the "physical protection" of children in the community.

Victims of abuse are required to provide details of their abuse to a group of male elders, which may cause additional trauma; In 2018, the policy was updated to specify that a victim may provide details of the abuse in writing rather than verbally. A victim may bring a confidant for support when approaching elders to present a case of abuse verbally. Elders are directed that a victim must not be required to face their abuser to present an accusation, however adult victims may do so if they wish.

Testimony based on repressed memories is not considered reliable enough to form the basis for internal action. Elders are encouraged to treat persons reporting this type of memory with kindness, but not to pursue the case unless further proof is found.

Repentance and Discipline
If allegations of child abuse satisfy the organization's religious tenets, an internal judicial committee is formed, and the accused individual may potentially be relieved of positions of responsibility in the congregation. Anyone found to have sexually molested a child, based upon the criteria established by the organization, and deemed by the elders to not demonstrate sufficient repentance is disfellowshipped from the congregation and shunned.

The elders are instructed to gauge the abuser's repentance based upon their subsequent visible support of congregation activities, such as attending congregation meetings, and actively supporting the denomination's door-to-door work. The sustained participation in the group's activities has resulted in sexual predators remaining in good standing in the congregation.

Reproof and restrictions
An abuser who is judged repentant by a committee of elders is given a 'public reproof', wherein it is announced to the congregation that the named individual "has been reproved", though the specific reason for reproof is not stated. Such a person is automatically debarred from serving in any appointed position in the congregation, however privileges can be restored in the future depending on whether he or she is deemed by the branch office to be a "known molester". A few weeks later, a talk may be given to the congregation, discussing the type of sin and the need to be on guard against it, but the reproved individual is not named in connection with this talk. It is the intention that the talk about the type of sin, and the previously made announcement of reproof, should allow other congregation members to interpret what type of sin had been committed.  When reprimanded, sex offenders may not offer public prayers, read paragraphs during congregation studies, or be given even minor responsibilities in the congregation, such as handling microphones or distributing literature in the Kingdom Hall.

Sex offenders are still permitted to participate in the congregation's house-to-house preaching. According to the Watch Tower Society's spokesperson, J. R. Brown, such ones are only allowed to preach when accompanied by a responsible adult. In 2016, a convicted child sex offender was filmed going door-to-door for the denomination.

For a considerable period of time, a reproved individual is not permitted to participate in meetings by commenting in group discussions or making presentations from the platform. A 1997 issue of The Watchtower article stated: "For the protection of our children, a man known to have been a child molester does not qualify for a responsible position in the congregation. Moreover, he cannot be a pioneer or serve in any other special, full-time service." Elders are advised to give "kindly cautions" to the abuser in regards to "not [being] alone with children," "refrain[ing] from holding children or displaying other forms of affection for them," and "not allowing children (other than his own) to spend the night in his home, not working in field service with a child, not cultivating friendships with children, and the like."

Former child molesters, including those who molested children before becoming Jehovah's Witnesses, those eventually reinstated into the congregation after being disfellowshipped, and those who were deemed repentant, are subject to a number of restrictions. Commenting on the effect of these restrictions, Jehovah's Witnesses' legal representative, Mario Moreno, stated that these restrictions alert members that the individual "lacks spiritual maturity." 'Privileges' may be restored to known child sex offenders if "considerable time has passed," at the discretion of local elders.

In 1995, elders were instructed that if a former child abuser moved from their congregation to another, they must send a letter to the body of elders in the new congregation outlining the offender's background and whether the abuser is still subject to 'restricted privileges'. However the 1997 Letter of Introduction of Jonathan Kendrick who was later convicted for child abuse failed to mention his confession of abuse, it even stated that 'he had helped young ones from veering off course.'

Positions of responsibility
The January 1, 1997, issue of The Watchtower stated, "For the protection of our children, a man known to have been a child molester does not qualify for a responsible position in the congregation. Moreover, he cannot be a pioneer or serve in any other special, full-time service." Whether or not a child abuser is deemed a "known molester" is left to the discretion of the local branch. The October 1, 2012, letter to elders states, "the branch office, not the local body of elders, determines whether one who has sexually abused a child is considered a known child molester" and adds, "It cannot be said in every case that one who has sexually abused a child could never qualify for privileges of service in the congregation."

Reporting to civil authorities
Cases of alleged abuse are reported to secular authorities if required by local laws or as instructed by the local branch office.

A press release issued in 2002 by Jehovah's Witnesses' Office of Public Information stated: "In addition to making a report to the branch office, the elders may be required by law to report even uncorroborated or unsubstantiated allegations to the authorities. If so, the elders receive proper legal direction to ensure that they comply with the law." The Watchtower has outlined the following policy: "Depending on the law of the land where he lives, the molester may well have to serve a prison term or face other sanctions from the State. The congregation will not protect him from this." A 2002 memo to all congregations stated: "Our position is that secular authorities deal with crime while elders deal with sin." Even where there is no mandatory reporting requirement, victims or others having knowledge of an incident of sexual abuse must not be discouraged from reporting it.

The New York Times commented:

In 2008, the Watch Tower Society of Britain, in discussions with the UK Charities Commission, undertook to produce a Child Protection Policy and update its procedures to bring them into line with other religious and secular bodies.

Cover-up allegations
In some cases, members of Jehovah's Witnesses have been prevented or deterred from reporting child molestation to civil authorities. Particularly since around 2000, the Jehovah's Witnesses organization has been accused of covering up cases of child molestation committed by its members. In March 2001, Christianity Today printed an article reporting allegations that Jehovah's Witnesses' policies made reporting sexual abuse difficult for members, and did not conform to typical treatment of such cases. The article also included a response by representatives of Jehovah's Witnesses. The Australian Royal Commission heard that an elder discouraged an abuse victim from going to the Commission by saying, "Do you really want to drag Jehovah's name through the mud?" In Ireland in 2016, two Jehovah's Witness elders were removed from their positions as punishment for reporting a child molester to the police after the London Branch legal department told them not to.

The BBC reported allegations of a cover-up in July 2002, in an episode of Panorama entitled "Suffer the Little Children". The report revealed that the headquarters of Jehovah's Witnesses, the Watch Tower Society, requires all congregations to submit details of child abuse allegations and maintains an internal database on all cases of child abuse reported to them. It described one case where a child came forward to the elders of her congregation to report sexual abuse by her father, but was sent home, despite their having known for three years that her father was an abuser. When the girl eventually went to the police, her father was convicted and sentenced to five years in prison.

According to Witness spokesman J. R. Brown, Jehovah's Witnesses are not required to report crimes to elders before calling civil authorities. Victims and their families are free to call police, he said, although some don't choose to. The Watch Tower Society maintains a policy with no explicit requirement for elders to report all child abuse cases where such is not required by law. Elders are instructed to "leave matters in Jehovah's hands" if an abuser denies the accusations and there is no second witness available.

2014 investigations in the United Kingdom
In 2013 at the Jehovah's Witnesses congregation of Moston, Manchester, England, church elder and convicted child sex offender Jonathan Rose, following his completion of a nine-month jail sentence for paedophile offences, was allowed in a series of public meetings to cross-examine the children he had molested. Rose was finally 'disfellowshipped' after complaints to the police and the Charity Commission for England and Wales.

In a separate incident, prior to the trial and conviction for rape and sexual assault in June 2014 of Mark Sewell, an elder of the congregation in Barry, Wales, the church conducted an internal investigation of the allegations, where the women and children had to face their alleged abuser in “judicial committee” hearings organised by their church. A child victim, for whom Sewell was later convicted of rape, alleged that she was questioned closely by church elders when she came forward years after the attack, and was required to describe the incident to them in intimate detail, with Sewell present, but her claims were dismissed by the committee and not taken to the police for further investigation. In June, Sewell was jailed for fourteen years for the rape and sexual abuse of parishioners, including children. All but one of Sewell's fellow elders who investigated claims against him, declined to give evidence in his Crown Court trial. They also provided no assistance to police and prosecutors in their investigation, despite “dis-fellowshipping” Sewell 20 years previously, and destroyed evidence showing claims against Sewell dating back more than 20 years. In June 2014, Sewell was sentenced to fourteen years in prison for eight sex offenses; in December 2014 he appealed unsuccessfully for reduction of his sentence.

In June and July 2014, the Charity Commission for England and Wales announced that it was formally investigating both the Moston and Barry congregations over their child protection policies, to be conducted independently of two statutory inquiries opened the previous month into Jehovah's Witnesses charities in relation to issues including child protection. The Charity Commission noted that it had "serious concerns" about the Manchester New Moston Congregation of Jehovah's Witnesses, having most recently opened a case into it in December 2013. The Watch Tower Society subsequently sought judicial review of the Charity Commission's enquiry; this was denied on 12 December 2014, on the grounds that the Charities Act 2011 required all other legal avenues to be exhausted prior to application for judicial review. Subsequent appeals against the investigation by the New Moston Congregation and the Watch Tower Bible and Tract Society of Britain to the Charity Commission's tribunal were rejected in April 2015.

In two separate cases in England in December 2014, a Jehovah's Witness in Bournemouth and a Jehovah's Witness elder from Plymouth were convicted and sentenced for the sexual abuse of children.

2015 Australian royal commission

The handling of child sexual abuse cases in Australia by Jehovah's Witnesses was examined by the Royal Commission into Institutional Responses to Child Sexual Abuse. The commission was established by the federal government in 2013 to investigate how institutions such as schools, churches, sports clubs and government organizations have responded to allegations and instances of child sexual abuse. Their "case studies showed that it was a common practice of religious institutions to adopt 'in-house' responses when dealing with allegations of child sexual abuse." In July and August 2015 it held a series of public hearings to present the accounts of two female sex abuse victims and also question seven elders and a circuit overseer associated with the congregations where the abuse took place. The commission also questioned two senior members of the Watch Tower Society Australian branch as well as Geoffrey Jackson, a member of the New York-based Governing Body.

The hearing was told that in response to a summons issued by the commission, the Watch Tower Society had produced 5,000 documents relating to 1,006 case files of allegations of child sexual abuse reported to Jehovah's Witness elders in Australia since 1950—each file for a different alleged perpetrator of child sexual abuse, including 579 cases in which the perpetrator confessed. The "case study regarding the Jehovah's Witnesses showed that the organisation dealt with allegations of child sexual abuse in accordance with internal, scripturally based disciplinary policies and procedures." The documents showed that of the alleged perpetrators, "not one was reported by the Church to secular authorities". The commission was told: "This suggests that it is the practice of the Jehovah's Witness Church to retain information regarding child sexual abuse offences but not to report allegations of child sexual abuse to the police or other relevant authorities." Officers of the Royal Commission "referred information in relation to 514 alleged perpetrators to police", adding that "of the remaining 492 alleged perpetrators identified in the case files, officers at the Royal Commission determined that there was either insufficient evidence in the case files to warrant referring matters to police or that the matters had already come to the attention of police".

An elder from the Australian branch office said that when not required by law to report abuse allegations to authorities, the church left the decision to report to authorities with the victim and his or her family. The commission found that the Watch Tower Society legal department routinely provided incorrect information to elders based on an incorrect understanding about what constitutes a legal obligation to report crimes in Australia. In March 2017, the Royal Commission reported that since its initial 2015 investigation, the Watch Tower Society reported 15 of the 17 allegations it received from members to authorities, indicating that the remaining two were not reported at the request of adult survivors of historical abuse.

The Australian royal commission found that, "We do not consider the Jehovah's Witness organisation to be an organisation which responds adequately to child sexual abuse. ... The organisation's retention and continued application of policies such as the two-witness rule in cases of child sexual abuse shows a serious lack of understanding of the nature of child sexual abuse." In its final report, the royal commission added, "As long as the Jehovah's Witness organisation continues to ... [rely on a literal interpretation of the Bible and 1st century principles to set practice, policy and procedure] ... in its response to allegations of child sexual abuse, it will remain an organisation that does not respond adequately to child sexual abuse and that fails to protect children."

Lawsuits
In 2021, David Splane, a Governing Body member, claimed that Jehovah's Witnesses settle cases out of court when possible because the jury is often biased and that it doesn't imply acceptance of guilt.

Canada
In 2004, a Canadian court awarded CAD$5000 to a plaintiff for the negligence of an elder who failed to follow the official policy of the church. However, the court dismissed charges against the Watch Tower Society, and directed the plaintiff to pay the Watch Tower Society's legal fees amounting to CAD$142,000.

On September 15, 2017 an application was filed in the Superior Court of Quebec for a class action lawsuit on behalf of victims of sexual abuse by a Jehovah's Witness in Quebec. Three corporations of Jehovah's Witnesses were named as defendants: The Watch Tower Bible and Tract Society of Canada, The Watch Tower Bible and Tract Society of Pennsylvania and The Watch Tower Bible and Tract Society of New York, Inc. In 2019, the Superior Court granted permission for the class action to proceed. Watchtower's request for appeal was granted by the Quebec Court of Appeal.

In 2017, it was also reported that a Calgary, Alberta law firm subsequently began an investigation for a national class action lawsuit against the Watchtower Bible and Tract Society of Canada for cases related to child sexual abuse. Subsequently, a nationwide class action lawsuit was filed in Ontario Superior Court of Justice.

United Kingdom
In 2011, UK attorney Ann Olivarius and US lawyer Jeff Anderson, through their partnership AO Advocates, brought the first successful civil claim in the UK against ministerial servants of Jehovah’s Witnesses for child abuse. In June 2015, the High Court of Justice in London awarded damages to the victim (a woman known as 'A') of £275,000 for the failure of Jehovah's Witnesses to protect her from a known pedophile, Peter Stewart. 'A' alleged Stewart abused her from the age of four and threatened that she would be "damned as a sinner" if she told anyone about the abuse. The elders became aware of the abuse in 1990 and announced that Stewart had been given a disciplinary reproof without specifying the reason. The abuse ended only when Stewart was arrested for offenses against another child in 1994. The court held that the elders failed to adequately warn the members of the congregation about their knowledge of past abuse by Stewart. The Watch Tower Bible and Tract Society of Britain sought several times to appeal against the judgement, but the Court of Appeal of England and Wales, holding "fair just and reasonable" to order the organization to pay the awarded damages, refused permission to appeal and upheld the ruling to pay to the victim £275,000 in compensation, in addition to the legal costs of the case, estimated at approximately £1 million.

United States
In 2007 during a trial motion in the Napa, California court against the Watchtower Society, victims' lawyers convinced the court that 'ecclesiastical privilege' does not supersede the legal obligation of clergy to report child sex abuse to secular authorities. The Watchtower Society paid an undisclosed amount without admitting wrongdoing in an out-of-court settlement with 16 unnamed victims of alleged sexual abuse. According to court documents obtained by NBC News, one plaintiff was awarded over US$780,000. The Press-Enterprise newspaper reported in 2008 that subpoenaed elders declined to testify against accused penitents, citing the confidentiality of penitent-clergy privilege. However the elders did not object to testifying once the court found that "the privilege of penitential communication did not apply".

In June 2012 the Superior Court of Alameda, California, ordered the Watchtower Society to pay US$21 million in punitive damages, in addition to compensatory damages, holding that the Society's policy to not disclose child abuse history of a member to parents in the congregation or to report abuse to authorities contributed to the sexual abuse of a nine-year-old girl. The court held that congregation elders, following the policies of the Watchtower Bible and Tract Society, contributed to the abuse. It held that the elders as agents of the Watchtower Society failed to disclose to other parents regarding the confession of the molester who inappropriately touched his step-daughter, adding that the degree of reprehensibility was of "medium range". Based on the ratio between the compensatory and punitive damages, the court subsequently reduced the Watchtower Society's total liability to US$10 million, Lawyers for the Society appealed the ruling, calling the decision "unprecedented" and denying responsibility for abuse. In April 2015, the appeal court reversed the punitive damages, finding that the congregation had no duty to warn the parents or members about the history of offences committed by other members. However, the court concluded that the Watchtower Society was negligent in preventing the abuse and upheld the trial court's decision on compensatory damages amounting to US$2.8 million to be paid by the Watchtower Society and the congregation. The Watchtower Society appealed against the negligence verdict to the supreme court of California and the case was settled for an undisclosed amount during appeal.

In October 2014, a case was heard in San Diego, California, about the sexual abuse of Jose Lopez by Gonzalo Campos. Witness elders were aware that Campos had confessed to the abuse of at least one other child in 1982, but in 1986 they recommended Campos as an instructor to Lopez. Campos moved to another congregation in 1987 and became an elder in 1993. Campos later confessed to abusing at least eight children between 1982 and 1995, and subsequently fled to Mexico. Campos was subsequently disfellowshipped in 1995. For failing to protect Lopez from a known offender and for its subsequent refusal to co-operate with the court, the Watchtower Society was ordered to pay US$13.5 million to the plaintiff. The Watchtower Society appealed the ruling. The appeal court vacated the judgment, granting that lesser sanctions might compel the Watchtower Society to comply with the court's requirements. While the document discovery dispute was still in progress the case was settled out of court in January 2018. In a separate case involving another victim of Gonzalo Campos, the Watchtower Society produced redacted copies of documents related to child sexual abuse in the United States from 1997 until 2001. The Watchtower Society asserted that it had no access to more recent documents held by the Christian Congregation of Jehovah's Witnesses, a separate subsidiary of the Watchtower Society. The court sanctioned Watchtower $4,000 for each day that it did not submit the documents. Watchtower unsuccessfully appealed against the ruling, and the court of appeals directed Watchtower to pay fines (US$48,000 by the time of the appeal) and submit to the court order. The case was settled out of court in February 2018. In 2015, another California trial court defaulted Watchtower and ordered it to pay US$4 million to the plaintiff after its failure to produce documents. Watchtower subsequently offered to produce documents on a rollout basis and appealed the decision to California appellate courts, but lost the appeal. Watchtower's further appeal to the United States Supreme Court was denied in October 2019. In 2014, it was reported that the law firm representing these lawsuits filed similar cases in Connecticut, Vermont, California, Oregon and New Mexico.

In 2016, the Delaware attorney general sued Watchtower claiming that elders failed to report an unlawful sexual relationship between a 35-year old woman and a 14-year-old boy, both of whom were disfellowshipped by elders. The court ruled that while communication between the adult perpetrator and elders was protected by penitent-clergy privilege, the communication with the minor was not. Watchtower reached a settlement with the state, paying $19,500 in fines without admitting guilt or liability. The elders were to participate in a training program provided by the State of Delaware.

In 2018, a jury in Thompson Falls, Montana, awarded $35 million to a victim of sexual abuse, claiming that the Jehovah's Witnesses church failed to protect her. The case was reportedly focused on the 'two witness rule' and the failure of congregation elders to turn the information over to secular authorities. The Watchtower Society argued that elders had no legal obligation to report abuse cases in Montana and appealed the ruling. In January 2020, the supreme court of Montana reversed and remanded the judgement in favor of Jehovah's Witnesses holding that the confidential communication elders received is specifically exempt under mandatory reporting statute.

See also

 Sexual abuse cases in church 
 Criticism of Jehovah's Witnesses
 Sexual abuse cases in Southern Baptist churches
 Catholic Church sex abuse cases

 Other related topics
 Child sexual abuse
 Religious abuse
 Scouting sex abuse cases
 Silentlambs

References

External links
Article of Erica Rodriguez's suit
Transcript of an interview with an abuse victim

Supportive
 Jehovah’s Witnesses’ Scripturally Based Position on Child Protection (legal resources), JW.org, April 2018.
 Letter from Watchtower Bible and Tract Society of Australia to all bodies of elders re child abuse, October 1, 2012. Submitted to Victoria Parliament Inquiry into the Handling of Child Abuse by Religious and Other Organisations, April 9, 2013.
 Response to Royal Commission letter dated 4 November 2016, Watchtower Bible and Tract Society of Australia, 3 January 2017

Criticism of Jehovah's Witnesses
Child sexual abuse scandals in Christianity
Sexual abuse cover-ups
Violence against children
Violence against men
Violence against women